Ernest Grey Sandford (16 August 1839 – 8 March 1910) was an English first-class cricketer active in 1859 to 1861 who played for Oxford University in five matches. He was born in Dunchurch and died in Exmouth. He became a Church of England priest, most notably Archdeacon of Exeter from 1888 until his death.

Sandford was educated at Rugby and Christ Church, Oxford. He held incumbencies at Landkey and Cornwood.

References

1839 births
1910 deaths
English cricketers
Oxford University cricketers
Gentlemen cricketers
19th-century English Anglican priests
Alumni of Christ Church, Oxford
People educated at Rugby School
Archdeacons of Exeter
People from Warwickshire